Rock N Roll Rebel: The Early Work is a box set collection by Little Steven (Steven Van Zandt), released on December 6, 2019. The set contains Van Zandt's first five studio albums remastered from the original master tapes for the first time ever. The box set also features 51 bonus tracks, including demos, studio outtakes, b-sides, remixes, and live tracks, many of which are previously unreleased. The set also includes the 1985 album Sun City by Van Zandt's protest supergroup Artists United Against Apartheid.

The initial release of the set contains seven vinyl LPs of the studio albums along with four CDs containing the 51 bonus tracks. The set was reissued on July 31, 2020 on CD format containing 10 CDs and 3 DVDs. Each DVD contains a concert from a different live tour between 1982 and 1987.

Bonus tracks
In 2021, Steven Van Zandt said of the box set, "I'd gone 25 years without remastering anything. So I had to really say, "Hold on — wait a minute! Lets' take care of all of this old business here and get everything remastered, and maybe we'll find some extra tracks." And we found over 50." Among the tracks found were songs that "were not quite finished, but finished enough to put on the album", Van Zandt said, like "Time" and "Rock N Roll Rebel". The latter was originally slated to be the title track of his second album before it became Voice of America. The set also includes a 1973 audience tape recording of the Little Walter song "Who Told You" by Southside Johnny and the Kid (Van Zandt), who performed as a blues duo for a couple of months. In the late 1970s, Van Zandt acted as songwriter and producer for Southside Johnny and the Asbury Jukes, and seven rehearsal recordings plus a live recording, all featuring Van Zandt, are included in the box set.

"Inside of Me" was recorded live on French TV in 1983. Van Zandt wrote in the box set liner notes, "I was doing a TV interview in Paris and the cat says, "we have a piano here, why don't you do a song?" So I did. Never did a solo performance before, haven't done one since." Having written "It's Been a Long Time" for Southside Johnny and the Asbury Jukes' 1991 album Better Days, Van Zandt wanted to end the box set with the song, as it summed up his early years. "But every version we looked at had some approval complication or something wrong somewhere, and I really hate asking anybody for anything," he wrote in the liner notes, "so I borrowed a guitar and just did it."

Track listing
All tracks are written by Steven Van Zandt, except where noted.

Original albums

Bonus discs
Tracks marked with an asterisk (*) are previously unreleased.

Live concert DVDs

Personnel
Adapted from the box set liner notes. See original albums for full credits.

Bonus discs
 Little Steven – producer, executive producer
 Steve Berkowitz – co-executive producer
 Louis Arzonico – co-executive producer, packaging, art, design
 Jean Beauvoir – co-producer (disc 2: tracks 3-7)
 Steve Thompson – co-producer (disc 2: tracks 4-7), mixing (disc 2: tracks 3-7, disc 4: tracks 1-4)
 Arthur Baker – co-producer (disc 3), mixing (disc 3: tracks 1-3), remixing (disc 3: tracks 4, 5)
 Paul Courtney – engineer (disc 1: track 2)
 Robert Bader – tape restoration, mixing, mastering (disc 1: track 2)
 Toby Scott – engineer (disc 1: tracks 12-14, 16, 17, disc 2: track 1)
 Bob Clearmountain – mixing (disc 1: tracks 12-17, disc 2: tracks 1, 13)
 Zoë Yanakis – engineer (disc 2: tracks 3-7) 
 Steven Escallier – engineer (disc 2: tracks 3-7)
 Paul Ray – engineer (disc 2: tracks 3-7)
 Dominic Maita – engineer (disc 2: tracks 3-7)
 Michael Krowiak – engineer (disc 2: tracks 3-7)
 Greg Calbi – original mastering (disc 2: tracks 3-7)
 Chris Lord-Alge – mixing, additional engineer (disc 3: tracks 1-3), remixing (disc 4: tracks 1-4)
 Jay Burnett – mixing (disc 3: tracks 1-5), additional engineer (disc 3: tracks 1-3), remixing (disc 3: tracks 4, 5)
 Aldo Marin – mixing (disc 3: tracks 1-3), editing (disc 3: tracks 1-5)
 John Davenport – additional engineer (disc 3: tracks 1-3)
 Albert Cabrera – editing (disc 3: tracks 1-5)
 Keith LeBlanc – editing (disc 3: tracks 1-3)
 Herb Powers – original mastering (disc 3: tracks 1-3)
 Frank Filipetti – mixing (disc 3: tracks 4, 5) 
 Michael Barbiero – mixing (disc 2: tracks 3-7, disc 4: tracks 1-4)
 Steven Rinkoff – mixing (disc 4: track 5)
 Bruce Forest – mixing (disc 4: track 6)
 Frank Heller – mixing (disc 4: track 6)
 David McNair – engineer, mixing (disc 4: tracks 8, 9)
 Greg Smith – engineer, mixing (disc 4: tracks 8, 9)
 Keith Freedman – engineer (disc 4: tracks 8, 9)
 Chris Shaw – additional mixing (disc 1: tracks 1, 12-15, 17, 18, disc 2: tracks 1, 8, 9)
 Bob Ludwig – remastering
 Holly Cara Price – archival producer 
 Rich Russo – archival producer
 Glenn Korman – tape research, archiving
 Kevin Przybylowski – archival transfers, digitizing

DVDs
Rockpalast: Live at Grugahalle: Essen, Germany - October 16, 1982
 Little Steven – vocals, guitar
 Jean Beauvoir – bass
 Benjamin King – keyboards
 Dino Danelli – drums
 Richie "LaBamba" Rosenberg – trombone
 Crispin Cioe – baritone saxophone
 Arno Hecht – tenor saxophone, flute
 Paul Litteral – trumpet
 Nelson Bogart – trumpet
 Monti Louis Ellison – percussion
 Zoë Yanakis – oboe

Rockpalast:  Live at Loreley: Sankt Goarshausen, Germany - August 25, 1984
 Little Steven – vocals, guitar
 Jean Beauvoir – guitar
 Gary Tibbs - bass
 David Rosenthal - keyboards
 Dino Danelli - drums

Live at the Ritz, New York, New York - October 8, 1987
 Little Steven – vocals, guitar
 Pat Thrall – guitar
 T. M. Stevens – bass
 Mark Alexander – keyboards
 Leslie Ming – drums

References

Steven Van Zandt albums
2019 compilation albums